The 2018 UK Music Video Awards were held on 25 October 2018 to recognise the best in music videos from United Kingdom and worldwide. The nominations were announced on 27 September 2018.

Video of the Year

Video genre categories

Craft and technical categories

Live and interactive categories

Individual and company categories

References

External links
Official website

UK Music Video Awards
UK Music Video Awards
UK Music Video Awards